The 2023 Las Vegas Aces season will be the franchise's 27th season in the Women's National Basketball Association and the 6th year the franchise is based in Las Vegas - after relocating from San Antonio and Utah. This will also be the second season under Head Coach Becky Hammon.

Transactions

WNBA Draft

Transactions

Roster Changes

Additions

Subtractions

Roster

Schedule

Regular Season

|- 
| 1
| May 20
| @ Seattle
| 
| 
| 
| 
| Climate Pledge Arena
| 
|- 
| 2
| May 25
| @ Los Angeles
| 
| 
| 
| 
| Crypto.com Arena
| 
|- 
| 3
| May 27
| Los Angeles
| 
| 
| 
| 
| Michelob Ultra Arena
| 
|- 
| 4
| May 28
| Minnesota
| 
| 
| 
| 
| Michelob Ultra Arena
| 

|- 
| 5
| June 2
| @ Atlanta
| 
| 
| 
| 
| Gateway Center Arena
| 
|- 
| 6
| June 4
| @ Indiana
| 
| 
| 
| 
| Gainbridge Fieldhouse
| 
|- 
| 7
| June 6
| @ Connecticut
| 
| 
| 
| 
| Mohegan Sun Arena
| 
|- 
| 8
| June 8
| @ Connecticut
| 
| 
| 
| 
| Mohegan Sun Arena
| 
|- 
| 9
| June 11
| Chicago
| 
| 
| 
| 
| Michelob Ultra Arena
| 
|- 
| 10
| June 15
| Seattle
| 
| 
| 
| 
| Michelob Ultra Arena
| 
|- 
| 11
| June 18
| Minnesota
| 
| 
| 
| 
| Michelob Ultra Arena
| 
|- 
| 12
| June 21
| @ Phoenix
| 
| 
| 
| 
| Footprint Center
| 
|- 
| 13
| June 24
| Indiana
| 
| 
| 
| 
| Michelob Ultra Arena
|
|- 
| 14
| June 26
| Indiana
| 
| 
| 
| 
| Michelob Ultra Arena
| 
|- 
| 15
| June 29
| New York
| 
| 
| 
| 
| Michelob Ultra Arena
| 

|- 
| 16
| July 1
| Connecticut
| 
| 
| 
| 
| Michelob Ultra Arena
| 
|- 
| 17
| July 5
| Dallas
| 
| 
| 
| 
| Michelob Ultra Arena
|
|- 
| 18
| July 7
| @ Dallas
| 
| 
| 
| 
| College Park Center
| 
|- 
| 19
| July 9
| @ Minnesota
| 
| 
| 
| 
| Target Center
|
|- 
| 20
| July 11
| Phoenix
| 
| 
| 
| 
| Michelob Ultra Arena
|
|- 
| 21
| July 12
| @ Los Angeles
| 
| 
| 
| 
| Crypto.com Arena
|
|- 
| 22
| July 20
| @ Seattle
| 
| 
| 
| 
| Climate Pledge Arena
|
|- 
| 23
| July 22
| @ Minnesota
| 
| 
| 
| 
| Target Center
|
|- 
| 24
| July 25
| @ Chicago
| 
| 
| 
| 
| Wintrust Arena
|
|- 
| 25
| July 30
| Dallas
| 
| 
| 
| 
| Michelob Ultra Arena
|

|- 
| 26
| August 1
| Atlanta
| 
| 
| 
| 
| Michelob Ultra Arena
|
|- 
| 27
| August 6
| @ New York
| 
| 
| 
| 
| Barclays Center
|
|- 
| 28
| August 8
| @ Dallas
| 
| 
| 
| 
| College Park Center
|
|- 
| 29
| August 11
| Washington
| 
| 
| 
| 
| Michelob Ultra Arena
|
|- 
| 30
| August 13
| Atlanta
| 
| 
| 
| 
| Michelob Ultra Arena
|
|- 
| 31
| August 17
| New York
| 
| 
| 
| 
| Michelob Ultra Arena
|
|- 
| 32
| August 19
| Los Angeles
| 
| 
| 
| 
| Michelob Ultra Arena
|
|- 
| 33
| August 22
| @ Atlanta
| 
| 
| 
| 
| Gateway Center Arena
|
|- 
| 34
| August 24
| @ Chicago
| 
| 
| 
| 
| Wintrust Arena
|
|- 
| 35
| August 26
| @ Washington
| 
| 
| 
| 
| Entertainment and Sports Arena
|
|- 
| 36
| August 28
| @ New York
| 
| 
| 
| 
| Barclays Center
|
|- 
| 37
| August 31
| Washington
| 
| 
| 
| 
| Michelob Ultra Arena
|

|- 
| 38
| September 2
| Seattle
| 
| 
| 
| 
| Michelob Ultra Arena
|
|- 
| 39
| September 8
| @ Phoenix
| 
| 
| 
| 
| Footprint Center
|
|- 
| 40
| September 10
| Phoenix
| 
| 
| 
| 
| T-Mobile Arena
|
|-

Standings

Statistics

Regular Season

Awards and Honors

References

External links
 Official website of the Las Vegas Aces

Las Vegas Aces
Las Vegas Aces seasons
Las Vegas Aces